Judge Proctor may refer to:

James McPherson Proctor (1882–1953), judge of the United States Court of Appeals for the District of Columbia Circuit
R. David Proctor (born 1960), judge of the United States District Court for the Northern District of Alabama